Dick Grant (25 June 1909 – 4 March 1997) was  a former Australian rules footballer who played with Collingwood in the Victorian Football League (VFL).

Notes

External links 

Dick Grant's profile at Collingwood Forever

1909 births
1997 deaths
Australian rules footballers from Victoria (Australia)
Collingwood Football Club players